A barrier or barricade is a physical structure which blocks or impedes something.

Barrier may also refer to:

Places
 Barrier, Kentucky, a community in the United States
 Barrier, Voerendaal, a place in the municipality of Voerendaal, Netherlands
 Barrier Bay, an open bay in Antarctica
 Barrier Canyon, the former name of Horseshoe Canyon (Utah)
 Barrier Lake, Alberta, Canada
 Barrier Mountain, the former name of Mount Baldy (Alberta)
 Barrier Ranges, a mountain range in New South Wales, Australia
 Division of Barrier, a former Australian Electoral Division in New South Wales
 The Barrier, a lava dam in British Columbia, Canada
 The Barrier (Kenya), an active shield volcano in Kenya
 The Barrier, a common synonym for the city of Broken Hill, New South Wales
 The Barrier, an early name for the Ross Ice Shelf, Antarctica

In arts and entertainment

Film
 The Barrier (1917 film), a lost 1917 American silent drama film
 The Barrier (1926 film), a silent film
 The Barrier (1937 film), an American film
 Barrier (film), a 1966 Polish film, released in the U.S. as Barrier 
 , an Egyptian film; see Gheorghe Dinică
 The Barrier (1979 film), a Bulgarian film
 The Barrier (1990 film), a Bahraini film

Games
 Barrier (video game), a 1979 arcade game by Vectorbeam

Music
 Barriers (album), by Frank Iero (2019)
 "Barrier", a 1985 song by Simon Townshend on the album Moving Target
 "Barriers", a song by Suede on their 2013 album Bloodsports
 "Barrier", a track from the soundtrack of the 2015 video game Undertale by Toby Fox

Television
 Barriers (TV series), a UK television series
 The Barrier (TV series), a 2020 Spanish-language dystopian drama TV series

Other uses
 Barrier (surname)
 Barrier (computer science), a type of synchronization in parallel computing
 Barrier (video game), a 1979 maze arcade game
 Barrier Air, a New Zealand airline
 Barrier Highway, a highway in Australia; it goes into SA from NSW.
 USS Barrier, a minesweeper in the U.S. Navy

See also
 Concrete barrier (disambiguation)
 Great Barrier (disambiguation)
 
 Barrière (disambiguation)